Christianity in Kanyakumari district is its second largest religion. The Catholic Church has about 400,000 followers, while the Protestant groups have about 500,000 members.

Christianity is said to date back to the 1st century CE. According to the tradition, St. Thomas, one of the twelve apostles, landed on the Malabar Coast (Kerala) in 52 CE and introduced Christianity. It is believed he built St. Mary's Church in Thiruvithamcode in 63 CE. During the colonial period Italian, British, Dutch and Portuguese Christians came to Tamil Nadu.

In 1961, Christians comprised nearly 37% of the population. In 2011, the Christian population of Kanyakumari is nearly 47% of the population.

Denominations 
The Roman Catholic Church (Latin Rite), the Church of South India, Assemblies of God in India, India Pentecostal Church of God, The Pentecostal Mission, The Salvation Army Church, the Syro-Malabar Catholic Church, the Jacobite Syrian Christian Church, the Syro-Malankara Catholic Church, the Malankara Orthodox Syrian Church, the Evangelical Church of India and other evangelical denominations are there. The Latin Rite of Roman Catholic Church (RC) is the oldest and the largest and has a homogeneous presence throughout the district. The second-largest church by number of members is the Church of South India (CSI) and third largest are Pentecostals.The vast majority are the members of Latin Rite Roman Catholic Church

Roman Catholic Church 

In 1542, St. Francis Xavier came to Kanniyakumari District.During the 16th century, he converted thousands of Paravar fishermen between Ramanathapuram and Kanyakumari to Catholicism. Between 1543 and 1544 Francis established forty-five churches in the coastal areas of Travancore.

Church of South India 
The British East India Company, helped Protestant churches to grow in the Kingdom of Travancore and Madras Presidency. Conversions took place in Kanyakumari and Tirunelveli from among the Nadar and Paraiyan communities by the work of the Church Missionary Society and London Missionary Society. In 1818, 3000 members of the Nadar caste were said to have embraced Christianity.

During the 18th century, on the request of kholf iyer the German missionary William Tobias Ringeltaube came to Travancore. and stayed in Mylaudy. Over a period of ten years, Ringeltaube succeeded in building his mission. The first church was built at Mylaudy in September 1809. Many churches and schools were established in many more. After a large church was built in Mylaudy. Ringeltaube Vethamonikam Memorial Church, Mylaudy was the cathedral of Kanyakumari Diocese of Church of South India (CSI). Many schools were started. Even non-Christian students also received education. A printing press was started by his mission in 1821.Medical wing of the mission was established in 1838.

The Syro-Malankara Catholic Church 
In 1996, the Syro-Malabar Catholic Church created its first `Diocese of Thuckalay`in Kanyakumari district, which was under the Syro-Malabar Catholic Archdiocese of Changanassery in Kerala until then. The same year the newly established `Diocese of Marthandam split from the Archdiocese of Trivandrum in Kanyakumari district.

Caste system 

During the period of Kingdom of Travancore, the present day Kanyakumari district was under the control of the Kingdom. It was caste-based. Those who belonged to lower castes were denied education, choice of occupation and basic dignity. The women of the lower castes were not allowed to cover their breasts and they had to pay the mulakkaram (breast tax) to the king if they wanted to cover their breasts. The tax was amount depended on their breast size. A woman baring her chest to noble class was considered a sign of respect, by both males and females from the lower castes. Higher-class women covered both breasts and shoulders, whereas lower castes including Nadar and Ezhava women were not allowed to do so, to show their low status. Uneasy with their social status, many Nadars embraced Christianity, and started to wear long cloths. When many more Nadar women turned to Christianity, many Hindu Nadar women adopted the Nair breast cloth.

From 1813 to 1859 laws were enacted and repealed by the Kingdom regarding the upper cloth issue. During this period waves of violence and agitation continued between the higher and lower castes. Due to the rebellion of lower castes, on 1859 the kingdom permanently permitted lower caste women to wear garments on their torsos.

The missionaries and the church helped the lower castes to break some of the shackles that had bound them for centuries. Through the help of the Church and missionaries, the breast tax and the system of Oozhiyam (hard work for little or no pay) was abolished by the Kingdom.

Notable churches 
 Curusadi St. Antony's Church
 Marthandam CSI Church
 Our Lady of Ransom Church, Kanyakumari
 Periyanayaki Shrine, Thiruvithancode
 St. Francis Xavier's Cathedral, Kottar
 St. Sebastian Church, Madathattuvilai
 St. Antony's Church, Chemmanvilai
 St. Mary's Church, Thiruvithamcode
 Mylaudy CSI church

See also 
 Christianity in Tamil Nadu
 List of Christian denominations in India

References